Ixil (Ixhil) is a Mayan language spoken in Mexico and Guatemala. It is the primary language of the Ixil people, which mainly comprises the three towns of San Juan Cotzal, Santa Maria Nebaj, and San Gaspar Chajul in the Guatemalan highlands and numerous towns in the states of Campeche and Quintana Roo in southeast México. There is also an Ixil speaking migrant population in Guatemala City, Mexico City and the United States. Although there are slight differences in vocabulary in the dialects spoken by people in the three main guatemalan Ixil towns, they are all mutually intelligible and should be considered dialects of a single language. According to historical linguistic studies Ixil emerged as a separate language sometime around the year 500AD.

Distribution 
Ixil language is spoken in Mexico in some municipalities of the states of Campeche and Quintana Roo. In the state of Campeche is spoken in the communities of Los Laureles and Quetzal-Edzná from the Campeche municipality and in Maya Tecún in Champotón municipality, while in Quintana Roo is spoken in the towns of Maya Balam and Kuchumatán, Bacalar municipality. 

In Guatemala, the municipalities where Ixil is spoken the most are San Gaspar Chajul, San Juan Cotzal and Santa María Nebaj, Quiché department.

Phonology

Grammar

Ixil pronominals are discerned between ergative ones and absolutive ones. A notable feature of the language's grammar is its ambiguity in discerning reflexive from reciprocal pronouns.

See also
 Ergative-absolutive language

Notes

Bibliography 
Asicona Ramírez, Lucas, Domingo Méndez Rivera, Rodrigo Domingo Xinic Bop. 1998. Diccionario Ixil de San Gaspar Chajul. La Antigua Guatemala: Proyecto Linguistico Francisco Marroquín.

Cedillo Chel, Antonio, Juan Ramírez. 1999. Diccionario del idioma ixil de Santa María Nebaj. La Antigua Guatemala: Proyecto Linguistico Francisco Marroquín.
England, Nora C. 1994. Ukutaʼmiil Ramaqʼiil Utzijobʼaal ri Mayaʼ Amaaqʼ: Autonomia de los Idiomas Mayas: Historia e identidad. (2nd ed.). Guatemala City: Cholsamaj.
Maximiliano Poma S., Tabita J.T. de la Cruz, Manuel Caba Caba et al. 1996. Gramática del Idioma Ixil. La Antigua Guatemala: Proyecto Linguistico Francisco Marroquín.
Oxlajuuj Keej Mayaʼ Ajtzʼiibʼ (OKMA). 1993. Mayaʼ chiiʼ. Los idiomas Mayas de Guatemala. Guatemala City: Cholsamaj.
Programa de Rescate Cultural Maya-Ixil. 1995. Aqʼbʼal Eluʼl Yol Vatzsaj: Diccionario Ixil. Guatemala City: Cholsamaj.

External links 
Doctrina y Confesionario en lengua Ixil
OLAC resources in and about the Ixil language
ELAR archive of Ixil Maya language documentation materials
Ixil Maya Conversation / Narrative Collection  at the Archive of the Indigenous Languages of Latin America, containing audio recordings and digital texts.

Mayan languages
Indigenous languages of Central America
Mesoamerican languages
Verb–subject–object languages
Agglutinative languages
Languages of Guatemala
Quiché Department
Languages of Mexico
Indigenous languages of Mexico